Werda is a municipality in the Vogtlandkreis district, in Saxony, Germany.

References 

Municipalities in Saxony
Vogtlandkreis